Siekierki is a neighborhood in the Mokotów district of Warsaw, Poland. It's a sparsely inhabited and poorly developed area located beside the Vistula river. Formerly Siekierki was a village, since 1916 is within Warsaw city borders. 

A location of technology and science park was planned there in 2005, but in 2009 plans were abandoned.

Notes

Neighbourhoods of Mokotów